Nikolai Vladimirovich Talyzin (28 January 1929 – 23 January 1991) was a Soviet statesman, economist and head of the Gosplan, or the State Planning Committee.

Talyzin was Chosen by Mikhail Gorbachev in October 1985 to help start the program of economic change known as perestroika, after serving five years as the Soviet representative at Comecon, the Eastern European trade bloc. He was appointed head of the State Planning Commission, or Gosplan, 
when almost every sector of the Soviet economy was still firmly under state control. He became one of the three First Deputy Premiers at this time, as well as a non-voting member of the Communist Party Politburo.

The planning commission's task shifted from setting production targets to mapping out economic strategy, as Gorbachev pushed his economic reforms. Talyzin came under strong criticism, and moved to the post of head of the Bureau for Social Development in 1988, blamed for slowing reforms. In September 1989, with perestroika failing to produce the promised results, he was dismissed, along with many other conservatives in Nikolai Ryzhkov's government, whom he blamed for slowing the pace of reforms.

Awards and decorations
 Order of Lenin
 Order of the October Revolution
 Order of the Red Banner of Labour
 Order of the Red Star
 Laureate of the State Prize of the USSR, twice (1968, 1974)

References

1929 births
1991 deaths
Communist Party of the Soviet Union members
Recipients of the Order of Lenin
Recipients of the USSR State Prize
Soviet economists
Politburo of the Central Committee of the Communist Party of the Soviet Union candidate members
People's commissars and ministers of the Soviet Union